Istar, iSTAR, or variants may refer to:

 ISTAR, Intelligence, Surveillance, Target Acquisition, and Reconnaissance, coöperating military functions
 Ištar, the Assyrian and Babylonian goddess of fertility, war, love, and sex
 Istar (Dragonlance), a fictional city in the Dungeons & Dragons game
 i*, a software modeling language
 Istari, the "wizards" in J. R. R. Tolkien's fictional world

See also
 STAR 1 (disambiguation) for values "StarI" / "Star I" / etc.
 One star (disambiguation) for values "I star" / "1 star" / etc.